Hoffmannola is a genus of air-breathing sea slugs, a shell-less marine pulmonate gastropod mollusks in the family Onchidiidae.

Species
Species within the genus Hoffmannola include:

 Hoffmannola hansi Ev. Marcus & Er. Marcus, 1967
 Hoffmannola lesliei (Stearns, 1892)

References

External links

Onchidiidae
Monotypic gastropod genera